Vesquneqan (also Romanized as Vesqūneqān; also known as Vasqūneqād and Vesqūneqāq) is a village in Jasb Rural District, in the Central District of Delijan County, Markazi Province, Iran. At the 2006 census, its population was 226, in 88 families.

References 

Populated places in Delijan County